John Thomas  (12 April 1805 – 5 March 1871) was an English religious leader, the founder of the Christadelphian movement. He was a Restorationist, with doctrines similar in part to some 16th-century Antitrinitarian Socinians and the 16th-century Swiss-German pacifist Anabaptists.

Early life
John Thomas was born in Hoxton Square, Hackney, London, on 12 April  1805, was the son of a Dissenting minister, also named John Thomas. His family is reputed to be descended from French Huguenot refugees. His family moved frequently, as his father took up various pastorships including a congregation in London, a brief stay in northern Scotland, back to London, and then to Chorley, Lancashire. At the age of 16, in Chorley, he began studying medicine. His family moved back to London, but John Thomas stayed in Chorley. After two years, he returned to London to continue his studies at the Guy's and St Thomas's hospitals for a further three years. He trained as a surgeon and had an interest in chemistry and biology, publishing several learned medical articles for The Lancet, one of which argued in favour of the importance of the use of corpses for the study of medicine (it was illegal in England to dissect them at this time).

Association with Alexander Campbell
The Marquis of Wellesley docked in New York and Thomas travelled on to Cincinnati, Ohio where he became convinced by the Restoration Movement of the need for baptism and joined them in October 1832. He soon came to know a prominent leader in the movement, Alexander Campbell, who encouraged him to become an evangelist. He spent his time travelling around the eastern States of America preaching, until eventually settling down as a preacher in Philadelphia. It was here on 1 January 1834 that he married Ellen Hunt.

Thomas also wrote for and was editor of the Apostolic Advocate which first appeared in May 1834. His studies during this period of his life generated the foundation for many of the beliefs he came to espouse as a Christadelphian and he began to believe that the basis of knowledge before baptism was greater than the Restoration Movement believed and also that widely held orthodox Christian beliefs were wrong. Whilst his freedom to believe his unique beliefs was accepted, many objected to the preaching of these beliefs as necessary for salvation. This difference led to a series of debates particularly between Thomas and Alexander Campbell. Because Thomas eventually rebaptised himself and rejected his former beliefs and associations, he was formally disfellowshipped in 1837. Some people, nonetheless, associated with him and accepted his views.

At this time the Millerite or Adventist movement was growing, and in 1843 Thomas was introduced to William Miller, the leader of the Millerites. He admired their willingness to question orthodox beliefs and agreed with their belief in the second coming of Christ and the founding of a millennial age upon His return. Thomas continued his studies of the Bible and in 1846 travelled to New York, where he gave a series of lectures covering 30 doctrinal subjects that later formed part of his book Elpis Israel (The Hope of Israel).

Christadelphians
Based upon his newfound understanding of the Bible, Thomas was rebaptised (a third and final time) in 1847 and the groups of congregations and individuals who shared his beliefs continued to grow. In 1848 the movement became international when he travelled to England in order to preach what he now saw as the true gospel message. Upon his return to America, Thomas moved from Richmond, Virginia to New York City and began to preach there. He made a point of speaking to the Jewish community because Dr Thomas had come to believe that Christianity did not replace the Law of Moses but rather fulfilled it. He believed that Christians must, though faith and baptism, become the "seed" (or, "descendant") of Abraham.

It was at this time that Thomas and those who shared similar beliefs became known as the Royal Association of Believers. This group of believers used the term "ecclesia", a Greek word meaning "assembly", to describe them. However, the movement did not have an ‘official’ name until 1864, when a name was chosen during the American Civil War (see below). Instead of having a system of clergy, all the brethren took equal responsibility on a rota to take on the role of presiding and speaking during their meetings.

When in 1861 the American Civil War broke out, Thomas travelled to the South and became concerned that the war had placed believers upon opposing sides. The movement as a whole considered that the war required them to make a stand for what they believed in as conscientious objectors. In order to be exempted from military service, it was required that believers had to belong to a recognised religious group that did not agree with participation in war. Thus in 1864, Thomas coined the name Christadelphian to identify members of the movement.  The term Christadelphian comes from Greek and means "Brethren in Christ". It was during the war that Thomas worked on the three volumes of Eureka, which discusses the meaning of the Book of Revelation.

On 5 May 1868, Thomas returned to England, where he travelled extensively giving lecturers about the Gospel message and meeting with Christadelphians in England. During this period of his life he found extensive support and help from Robert Roberts who had been converted during a previous visit to England by Thomas. Following his return to America, he made one final tour of the Christadelphian congregations prior to his death on 5 March 1871 in Jersey City.  He was buried in the Green-Wood Cemetery, Brooklyn, New York.

Legacy
Thomas did not claim to be any kind of prophet, or in any way inspired, but through study and borrowing from the work of others he believed that many traditional church teachings were incorrect and that from the Bible he could prove that position.
The Lecturer [John Thomas] commenced by denying a statement which had appeared in many of the London and county newspapers, and amongst them, one made by a religious Editor in this town, to the effect that he assumed to himself the true, infallible, prophetic character, as one sent from God, verbatim. He would appeal to his writings -- and he had written a great deal in twelve years -- and to his speeches, whether he had ever claimed to be such, in the remotest degree whatever. He believed truth as it was taught in the scriptures of truth....

Modern Christadelphians generally believe Thomas was right and adhere to the positions he established as defined within the Christadelphian statements of faith; Christadelphians feel, too, that Thomas' example of an inquiring attitude is also an important legacy.

Thomas wrote several books, one of which, Elpis Israel (1848), in its first section, sets out many of the fundamental scriptural principles believed by Christadelphians to this day.

Thomas' exposition of Bible prophecy led to him making various detailed predictions about then current-day events of which some did not come to pass, as was noted in the foreword to subsequent editions of Elpis Israel after his death, a point that Thomas himself accepted could happen.

Bibliography

Books
 Elpis Israel (1848)
 Eureka: An Exposition of the Apocalypse (In 5 Volumes)
 Exposition of Daniel (1868)

Booklets
 Anastasis
 The Apostacy Unveiled (1872)
 Blasphemy and the Names of Blasphemy
 The Book Unsealed: A Lecture on the Prophetic Periods of Daniel and John (1869)
 Catechesis
 Chronikon Hebraikon
 Destiny of the British Empire as revealed in the Scriptures (1871)
 Eternal Life (1848)
 Faith In the Last Days (posthumous anthology of writings from 1845 to 1861)
 How to Search the Scriptures (1867)
 The Last Days of Judah's Commonwealth
 Mystery of the Covenant of the Holy Land Explained (1854)
 Odology
 Phanerosis (1869)
 The Revealed Mystery

Magazines
The Apostolic Advocate (Editor) (1834–39)
The Herald of the Future Age (Editor) (1843–49)
Herald of the Kingdom and Age to Come (Editor) (1851–61)

See also
 Christadelphians
 Elpis Israel

References

Bibliography
 Peter Hemingray, John Thomas, His Friends and His Faith
 Charles H. Lippy, The Christadelphians in North America (Lewiston/Queenston: Edwin Mellen Press, 1989).
 Robert Roberts, Dr Thomas: His Life and Work (Birmingham: The Christadelphian, 1873). Available online, AngelFire.com.
 Bryan R. Wilson, Sects and Society: A Sociological Study of the Elim Tabernacle, Christian Science and Christadelphians (London: Heinemann, 1961; Berkeley/Los Angeles: University of California Press, 1961).

External links
Works by John Thomas and other authors
Works by John Thomas and other Christadelphian writers

1805 births
1871 deaths
19th-century biblical scholars
19th-century British writers
19th-century Christian theologians
American Christian religious leaders
American Christian theologians
British biblical scholars
Burials at Green-Wood Cemetery
Christadelphians
English Christians
English emigrants to the United States
People from Hackney Central
People from Hoxton